Robert Laurence Wiese (born 9 November 1940) is a former Australian politician. He was a National Party member of the Western Australian Legislative Assembly, representing Narrogin from 1987 to 1989 and Wagin from 1989 to 2001. From 1993 to 1997 he was Minister for Police and Emergency Services.

References

1940 births
Living people
National Party of Australia members of the Parliament of Western Australia
Members of the Western Australian Legislative Assembly
Place of birth missing (living people)
21st-century Australian politicians